"Street Tuff" is a song by British producer and toaster Rebel MC and Double Trouble. Released in 1989 as their second single from the debut album, Rebel Music (1990), it became a commercial success and the biggest hit of both performers' careers, peaking at number three on the UK Singles Chart. It is the follow-up to their first hit, "Just Keep Rockin'", which made it into the UK top 20. Additionally "Street Tuff" also peaked within the top 10 in Belgium, Greece, the Netherlands, and Switzerland. A music video was also produced to promote the single.

Critical reception
David Taylor-Wilson from Bay Area Reporter named the song "one of the most infectious grooves we've heard all year", noting that it "mixes the rhythms of Jamaican reggae with a house music beat. Just try and sit still when this one’s playing." Bill Coleman from Billboard wrote that "clever rhyming powered by insinuating club beats" could generate multiformat play to follow the UK act's previous smash, "Just Keep Rockin'". David Giles from Music Week complimented it as a "splendid duet between hot young rapper Rebel MC and former Simply Red backing vocalist Janet Rose, conducted to an instrumental track that sounds very much like a dancehall reggae groove speeded up to 45 rpm! Brilliant and irresistibly danceable." A reviewer from The Network Forty felt that featuring the "sultry Annie Lennox style vocals" of the singer, "this rap-dance record covers both musical realms with equal zeal." 

Sian Pattenden from Smash Hits said, "Quite a funky little number this, though very much in the same vein as their last single. There are lots of "yeahs", a boogalong beat and a host of currazy rhythms to keep you dancing. The words are very hard and tough, because the Rebel Mc is "street tuff" and he stings "like a bee" and that sorts of thing." Frank Owen from Spin found that the song is "a single masquerading as an album", "both marketing gimmick and a testament to the way the British mix and match different musical genres, unlike in the US, where the demarcation lines between house, hip hop and reggae still remain fiercely patrolled aesthetic boundaries."

Charts

Weekly charts

Year-end charts

References

External links
 Rebel MC on Discogs
 Street Tuff - lyrics at genius.com

1989 songs
1989 singles
Rebel MC songs
Double Trouble (dance music producers) songs
Hip house songs